Reece James (born 8 December 1999) is an English professional footballer who plays as a right-back for  club Chelsea and the England national team.

James joined the Chelsea academy as a youth and turned professional in 2017, a season where he captained the under-18s to victory in the FA Youth Cup and was named Academy Player of the Season. A productive loan spell with Wigan Athletic of the Championship saw him promoted to the Chelsea first team upon his return in 2019.

After representing England at various youth levels, James was called up to the full international side for the first time in October 2020, earning his first cap against Wales.

Early life
James was born in Redbridge, Greater London, and attended Isleworth and Syon School. He is from a family all involved in football. His sister Lauren is also a professional footballer and signed for Chelsea Women in July 2021. Their father Nigel is a football coach. He is of Jamaican descent through his father.

Club career

Early career

Starting his grassroots playing career at Kew Park Rangers and Epsom Eagles (where Conor Gallagher was also one of his team mates), James signed with Chelsea at the age of eight, and had a short spell at West London rivals Fulham when he was seven. He played as a striker idolizing Didier Drogba in his early teens, but was moved to the midfield, and later to a right-back position where he struggled at first. He turned professional with Chelsea in March 2017. During the 2017–18 season he captained the under-18s to win the FA Youth Cup and was named Academy Player of the Season. He signed a new four-year contract with the club in June 2018. 

In June 2018, James joined Championship club Wigan Athletic on loan for the 2018–19 season. He made his first-team debut on 4 August, starting in Wigan's first game of the season, helping his side to a 3–2 home victory over Sheffield Wednesday. He scored his first goal for Wigan on 4 November, scoring the first goal with a free kick in the sixth minute of a 2–1 home loss to Leeds United. In March 2019, he was selected to the 2018–19 Championship Team of the Season. He won three awards at Wigan Athletic's end of season awards, including Player of the Year.

2019–2021: First-team breakthrough and UEFA Champions League title
On 25 September 2019, James made his debut for Chelsea after returning from injury. He scored his first goal and assisted two in a 7–1 win over Grimsby Town in the third round of the 2019–20 EFL Cup. James became Chelsea's youngest ever goalscorer in the UEFA Champions League when he scored the fourth goal of their 4–4 comeback draw with Ajax on 5 November. He signed a long-term contract extension with Chelsea on 16 January 2020.

On 14 September 2020, James scored his first Premier League goal, in a 3–1 win for Chelsea against Brighton & Hove Albion. On 5 December, James made his 50th appearance for Chelsea in all competitions in the club's 3–1 league win over Leeds United.

In January 2021, James was subject to racist abuse online. In March, he deleted his Instagram account in response to the abuse he received. On 29 May, James won his first-ever Champions League as Chelsea won 1–0 against Manchester City in the final in Porto.

2021–present
On 28 August 2021, James was sent off at the end of the first half of a 1–1 draw against Liverpool due to a handball incident. He scored two goals in the second half of a 3–0 win over Newcastle United at St James' Park on 30 October. At the end of the season James was nominated for the PFA Young Player of the Year award.

On 5 September 2022, James signed a new six-year contract with Chelsea, committing to the club until June 2028. His performances were praised in October 2022, although later that month he suffered a knee injury, and had to see a specialist doctor. He was injured on his first game back, on 27 December 2022, being substituted after 53 minutes. he was ruled out of play for a further four weeks.

International career

Youth
James has represented England at youth level from under-18 up to under-21. In May 2017, James was included in the under-20 squad for the 2017 Toulon Tournament. He started in the final as England beat the Ivory Coast to retain their title. In July, James was part of the under-19 squad that won the 2017 UEFA European Under-19 Championship. He started in the semi-final against the Czech Republic.

James was a member of the under-20 squad that travelled to the 2019 Toulon Tournament and was carried off on a stretcher with ankle ligament damage during the first half of the final group game defeat to Chile on 7 June 2019. On 4 October, James was included in the under-21 squad for the first time. He made his under-21 debut during the 3–0 2021 UEFA European Under-21 Championship qualification victory away to Albania on 15 November.

Senior
On 5 October 2020, James was called up for the first time to the senior team by manager Gareth Southgate following an injury to Raheem Sterling. He made his debut on 8 October at Wembley Stadium, coming on as a 58th-minute substitute for Kieran Trippier in a 3–0 win over Wales. He was sent off for dissent after the final whistle in his second start, against Denmark. James was named in the 26-man England squad for Euro 2020. At Euro 2020, James started in the 0–0 draw against Scotland.

In November 2021, he said that he was in the best form of his career, and that he hoped to become England's first-choice right-back.

In October 2022, following a knee injury sustained playing for Chelsea in the Champions League against AC Milan, James was ruled out of the 2022 FIFA World Cup. He later stated he was "devastated" to be excluded from the England squad.

Personal life
In August 2020, James made a personal donation and posted a link on his social media accounts to a Crowdfunder site which was looking to boost Wigan's funds; in a bid to save his former loan club. He wrote in the post 'Come on let's help @laticsofficial out' in a bid to encourage others to follow.

In January 2021, Marcus Rashford praised James along with his fellow teammate Mason Mount for their "amazing" charitable work. James had spent the past 18 months volunteering with a London-based charity, The Felix Project.

James credits his father, Nigel James, Chelsea youth team coaches Frank O'Brien, Joe Edwards, and Jody Morris as having major influence on his career.

Style of play
His former manager at Chelsea, Thomas Tuchel, described him as "strong and influential" during an interview with Chelsea TV. He had a wing-back partnership with Ben Chilwell at both club and international level.

Career statistics

Club

International

Honours
Chelsea U18
U18 Premier League: 2016–17, 2017–18
FA Youth Cup: 2016–17, 2017–18

Chelsea
UEFA Champions League: 2020–21
UEFA Super Cup: 2021
FA Cup runner-up: 2019–20, 2020–21, 2021–22
EFL Cup runner-up: 2021–22

England U19
UEFA European Under-19 Championship: 2017

England U20
Toulon Tournament: 2017

England
UEFA European Championship runner-up: 2020

Individual
Toulon Tournament Best XI: 2017
Chelsea Academy Player of the Year: 2017–18
Wigan Athletic Player of the Year: 2018–19
Wigan Athletic Player's Player of the Year: 2018–19
Wigan Athletic Goal of the Season: 2018–19
FA Cup Team of the Year: 2020–21
PFA Community Champion Award: 2020–21

References

External links

Profile at the Chelsea F.C. website
Profile at the Football Association website

1999 births
Living people
Footballers from the London Borough of Redbridge
English footballers
Association football defenders
Fulham F.C. players
Chelsea F.C. players
Wigan Athletic F.C. players
English Football League players
Premier League players
FA Cup Final players
UEFA Champions League winning players
England youth international footballers
England under-21 international footballers
England international footballers
UEFA Euro 2020 players
Black British sportsmen
English sportspeople of Jamaican descent